The 2015 Budha Subba Gold Cup was the 17th edition of the Budha Subba Gold Cup held in Dharan and sponsored by Red Bull. Seven teams from Nepal and one from India participated in the tournament. All matches were held at the ANFA Technical  Center Dharan. A lot of changes were made regarding the format of the tournament, the tournament took place in February as opposed to April, when it previously took place. Also, the prize money for the winning team was increased to make the tournament more attractive. Belgharia Sporting Club from Calcutta, India, who won this tournament in 1999, was also meant to join the tournament but was replaced by another Indian Team, Sikkim Sunalchu FC.

Teams

Bracket
The following is the bracket which the 2015 Budha Subba Gold Cup resembled. Numbers in parentheses next to the match score represent the results of a penalty shoot-out.

Awards and Prize Money

References

Budha Subba Gold Cup
Football cup competitions in Nepal
2014–15 in Nepalese football
2015 in Nepalese sport